FGR may refer to:

 Attorney General of Mexico (Fiscalía General de la República)
 Eiffage, a French construction company
 Fetal growth restriction
 FGR (gene)
 Fongoro language of Chad and Sudan 
 Forest Green Rovers F.C., a football club in England